The Nude Woman (French: La femme nue) is a 1926 French silent drama film directed by Léonce Perret and starring Iván Petrovich, Louise Lagrange and Nita Naldi. Based on a play by Henry Bataille, it was remade as a sound film in 1932.

Cast
 Iván Petrovich as Pierre Bernier  
 Louise Lagrange as Lolette  
 Nita Naldi as Princesse de Chabrant  
 André Nox as Prince de Chabran  
 Blanche Beaume as Madame de Garcin  
 Mary Harris as Sonia  
 Maurice de Canonge as Rouchard  
 Henri Rudaux as Maitre Rivet, notaire  
 Richard as Arnheim 
 Alexis Nogornoff as Gréville 
 Bidau 
 Clairette de Savoye 
 René Ginet 
 Hope Johnson 
 André Liabel

See also 
 The Naked Truth (1914)
 The Nude Woman (1922)
 The Nude Woman (1932)

References

Bibliography 
 Dayna Oscherwitz & MaryEllen Higgins. The A to Z of French Cinema. Scarecrow Press, 2009.

External links 
 

1926 films
French silent feature films
1920s French-language films
Films directed by Léonce Perret
French films based on plays
French black-and-white films
French drama films
1926 drama films
Silent drama films
1920s French films